Jimmy Williamson (2 May 1928 – 21 February 2015) was a Scottish professional footballer who played in the Scottish League for Dunfermline Athletic and Montrose as a centre half.

Personal life 
Williamson's younger brother Arthur was also became a footballer. In 1946, he was called up to the Royal Navy and served in Hong Kong and Singapore. He was a butcher by trade.

References 

1928 births
2015 deaths
Footballers from Perth and Kinross
Scottish footballers
Scottish Football League players
Scottish butchers
Association football wing halves
Dunfermline Athletic F.C. players
Montrose F.C. players
20th-century Royal Navy personnel